Kamptonema is a genus of cyanobacteria belonging to the family Microcoleaceae.

The genus was first described by O. Strunecký, J. Komárek and J. Smarda in 2014.

Species:
 Kamptonema chlorinum (Kützing ex Gomont) Strunecký, Komárek & J.Smarda, 2014
Kamptonema proteus
Kamptonema proteus

References

Oscillatoriales
Cyanobacteria genera